Sir Reginald Louis Secondé  (28 July 1922 – 26 October 2017) was a British diplomat who served as Ambassador to Chile, Romania and Venezuela. He was the son of Lt-Colonel Emile Charles Secondé and Dorothy Kathleen (née Sutherland). On 4 June 1951, he married Catherine Penelope Sneyd-Kynnersley (9 October 1919 – June 2004).

Secondé was educated at Beaumont and King's College, Cambridge. He served during the Second World War as a Major in the Coldstream Guards.

Predeceased by his wife, Secondé had one son, two daughters and grandchildren.  He died on 26 October 2017 at the age of 95.

References

Who's Who 2010
And then by chance, autobiography

1922 births
2017 deaths
Alumni of King's College, Cambridge
Ambassadors of the United Kingdom to Chile
Ambassadors of the United Kingdom to Romania
Ambassadors of the United Kingdom to Venezuela
British Army personnel of World War II
Coldstream Guards officers
Commanders of the Royal Victorian Order
English Roman Catholics
Knights Commander of the Order of St Michael and St George